Renaissance and Reformation  is a multidisciplinary journal devoted to what is currently called the early modern world (see early modern period).  R&R was founded by Natalie Zemon Davis and others in 1964, and is sponsored by the Centre for Reformation and Renaissance Studies at Victoria University in the University of Toronto; the Toronto Renaissance Colloquium, the Pacific Northwest Renaissance Society, and the Canadian Society for Renaissance Studies. 

The journal is published quarterly. Each issue contains four to five scholarly articles as well as book reviews in English and French. R&Rs current editor is Alan Shepard of the University of Guelph.

External links

History journals
Publications established in 1964
Delayed open access journals
Quarterly journals